A chentu is a horse whip which looks like a crooked stick, and is a typical attribute of Aiyanar, Krishna in his aspect as Rajagopala, and Shiva with Nandi. The attribute of chentu, which is etymologically derived from a Tamil word, generally appears in Southern India, especially in Hindu images of Tamil Nadu state, India.

References 

Dictionary of Hindu Lore and Legend by Anna Dallapiccola

Weapons in Hindu mythology
Indian melee weapons
Weapons of India
Whips